Raghoebarsing Airstrip  is located near Matapi, Suriname.

Charters and destinations 
Charter Airlines serving this airport are:

See also

 List of airports in Suriname
 Transport in Suriname

References

Airports in Suriname